Junior dos Santos (born 30 January 1984) is a Brazilian mixed martial artist and professional wrestler who competes in the Heavyweight division of Eagle FC. As a mixed martial artist, he is a former UFC Heavyweight Champion; as a professional wrestler, Dos Santos makes appearances for All Elite Wrestling (AEW) as a member of the American Top Team.

Background
Dos Santos and his two siblings were raised by a single mother, Maria, after his alcoholic father, Sebastian, left the family in the mid-1990s. He started to work at the age of ten in order to help his family. He trained in capoeira throughout his teenage years before he began taking martial arts seriously at 21, when he began training in Brazilian jiu-jitsu under Yuri Carlton. After six months of training, Dos Santos won a few jiu-jitsu tournaments in Salvador. One year later, Dos Santos was invited to join a boxing practice by a friend, where he met his boxing coach Luiz Carlos Dórea. Dórea also trained mixed martial arts, and roughly a year after he started training in boxing, he had his debut professional fight.

Mixed martial arts career

Early career
Dos Santos turned professional in 2006, at the age of 22. He fought in small promotions in Brazil, such as Demo Fight, Extreme Fighting Championship, Minotauro Fights and Mo Team League. He won six of his first seven bouts, suffering his only loss to Joaquim Ferreira, a fighter he had previously beaten.

Ultimate Fighting Championship (2008–2021)

Debut (2008–2010)
Dos Santos debuted for the UFC on 25 October 2008 at UFC 90. Considered a major underdog, he knocked out top contender Fabrício Werdum at a minute and twenty seconds of the first round, earning himself a "Knockout of the Year" award.

Returning on 21 February 2009 at UFC 95 he fought promotional newcomer Stefan Struve, defeating him at fifty-four seconds of the first round by knockout.

On 19 September 2009, Dos Santos continued his winning streak and defeated Mirko Cro Cop at UFC 103. During the third round Dos Santos dominated Cro Cop in the clinch with knee strikes and punches. A knee from the clinch and a right uppercut apparently caused damage to Mirko's left eye, causing him to submit verbally.

UFC 108 scheduled a fight between Dos Santos and Gabriel Gonzaga. However, Gonzaga pulled out of the bout on 25 November 2009 due to a staph infection. Instead, on 2 January 2010, Dos Santos fought Gilbert Yvel, winning the fight via TKO at two minutes and seven seconds of the first round.

Dos Santos faced Gabriel Gonzaga on 21 March 2010 at UFC Live: Vera vs. Jones. He won the fight via knockout in the first round, earning him his second "Knockout of the Night" award.

Heavyweight title contender (2010–2011)
Dos Santos faced Roy Nelson on 7 August 2010, at UFC 117. The fight saw Dos Santos use a variety of strikes and, for the first time, a successful takedown. Despite Dos Santos's striking ability, Nelson was able to stay in the fight, resulting in the fight going to decision. Dos Santos won the fight via unanimous decision. Following the win, Dos Santos was expected to challenge Cain Velasquez for the heavyweight title. However, a torn rotator cuff suffered by Velasquez side-lined the champion for nearly a year.

On 11 January 2011, the president of the UFC, Dana White, announced that Dos Santos would be one of the coaches of The Ultimate Fighter Season 13, opposite Brock Lesnar. They were scheduled to face each other on 11 June 2011, at UFC 131, but Lesnar pulled out of the bout due to a recurrence of diverticulitis and was replaced by Shane Carwin. Dos Santos dominated Carwin and won the fight via unanimous decision, relying predominantly on his boxing skills, but showed more variety in his game by landing a couple of kicks and completing two takedowns in the third round.

UFC Heavyweight Champion (2011–2012)
Dos Santos faced Cain Velasquez at UFC on Fox 1 for the UFC Heavyweight Championship on 12 November 2011. He won the fight via knockout at 64 seconds into the first round. The performance also earned him his third "Knockout of the Night" award. After the fight, it was revealed that he had a torn meniscus in his knee; he subsequently underwent a successful knee surgery.

Dos Santos was scheduled to face Alistair Overeem on 26 May 2012 at the MGM Grand Garden Arena at UFC 146. On 4 April 2012, the Nevada State Athletic Commission announced Overeem had failed a pre-fight drug test. Consequently, Overeem's request for a license was denied. On 20 April 2012, Dana White the UFC president announced Frank Mir would be replacing Overeem. Dos Santos was able to keep the fight standing, showing his superior boxing skills, eventually winning via KO in the second round.

A rematch against Cain Velasquez was expected on 22 September 2012 at UFC 152. However, it was later announced by Dana White that the fight would take place in Las Vegas on 29 December 2012 at UFC 155. Dos Santos lost via unanimous decision. This marked the first time Dos Santos had suffered a loss in the UFC. Dos Santos later claimed that he was training so hard prior to the bout with Velasquez that he developed rhabdomyolysis, a (sometimes fatal) breakdown of muscle fibers that releases their contents into the bloodstream, and that the condition affected his performance during the fight.

Back into contention (2013–2021)
Dos Santos was expected to face Alistair Overeem on 25 May 2013 at UFC 160. However, in early March, Overeem pulled out of the bout citing an injury. The bout was expected to be rescheduled for a future event, However, on 9 March, UFC President Dana White confirmed that Dos Santos's next opponent would be Mark Hunt at the same event. Dos Santos won the fight via third-round knockout. This fight earned both participants Fight of the Night award.

A third fight with Cain Velasquez took place on 19 October 2013 at UFC 166. Although Dos Santos experienced more moments of success than in their second fight, he was still dominated by Velasquez for most of the fight. He lost via TKO at 3:09 of the fifth round.

Dos Santos was expected to face Stipe Miocic on 24 May 2014 at UFC 173. However, the bout was delayed and was scheduled to take place a week later on 31 May 2014 at The Ultimate Fighter Brazil 3 Finale. However, on 5 May, it was announced that Dos Santos pulled out of the fight citing a hand injury and he was replaced by Fábio Maldonado.

A rescheduled bout with Miocic took place as the main event at UFC on Fox 13 on 13 December 2014. Dos Santos won the back-and-forth fight via unanimous decision. The performance earned both participants Fight of the Night honors.

After a year away from the sport, Dos Santos had the three-years-delayed fight with Alistair Overeem which took place on 19 December 2015 at UFC on Fox 17. He lost the bout by technical knockout in the second round.

Dos Santos faced Ben Rothwell on 10 April 2016 at UFC Fight Night 86. He won the fight via unanimous decision.

Dos Santos was originally expected to face Stefan Struve in a rematch on 19 February 2017 at UFC Fight Night 105. However on 12 January, Struve pulled out due to a shoulder injury. Despite having over six weeks before the event, promotion officials elected to remove Dos Santos from the event instead of having him face a replacement.

Dos Santos faced Stipe Miocic on 13 May 2017 at UFC 211 for the UFC Heavyweight Championship. He had previously beaten Miocic by unanimous decision at UFC on Fox: dos Santos vs. Miocic in 2014. Dos Santos lost the fight via TKO in the first round.

Dos Santos was expected to face Francis Ngannou on 9 September 2017 at UFC 215. However, on 18 August, Dos Santos was pulled from the match after being notified of a potential USADA violation. On 24 April 2018 Dos Santos was cleared of intentionally using of Performance-enhancing drugs (PEDs) by USADA, after it was determined he had taken tainted supplements which contained hydrochlorothiazide from the compounding pharmacies in Brazil. He became eligible to compete on 24 April 2018.

Dos Santos returned from his suspension and faced former WSOF Heavyweight Champion Blagoy Ivanov on 14 July 2018 at UFC Fight Night 133. He won the fight via unanimous decision.

Dos Santos faced Tai Tuivasa on 2 December 2018 at UFC Fight Night 142. He won the fight via technical knockout in round two.

Dos Santos faced Derrick Lewis in the main event of UFC on ESPN+ 4 on 9 March 2019. He won the fight via TKO in the second round. This fight earned him the Fight of the Night award.

Dos Santos faced Francis Ngannou on 29 June 2019 at UFC on ESPN 3. He lost the fight via technical knockout in the first round.

Dos Santos was scheduled to face Alexander Volkov on 9 November 2019 at UFC on ESPN+ 21. However, Dos Santos was forced to pull out from the event due to a bacterial infection in his leg.

As the first bout of his new eight-fight contract, Dos Santos faced Curtis Blaydes on 25 January 2020 at UFC Fight Night 166. He lost the fight via technical knockout in the second round.

Dos Santos faced Jairzinho Rozenstruik on 15 August 2020 at UFC 252. He lost the fight via technical knockout in the second round.

Dos Santos faced Ciryl Gane on 12 December 2020 at UFC 256. He lost the fight via technical knockout in the second round.

On 3 March 2021, it was announced that Dos Santos had been released from the UFC.

Eagle Fighting Championship 
Dos Santos made his Eagle FC debut against Yorgan De Castro on 20 May 2022 at Eagle FC 47. Dos Santos outstruck De Castro for most of the bout, but would go on to lose by technical knockout due to a doctor stoppage after suffering a shoulder injury early in the third round.

Professional wrestling career

All Elite Wrestling (2021)
In the summer of 2021, dos Santos began making appearances for the professional wrestling promotion All Elite Wrestling, backing American Top Team head Dan Lambert along with ATT affiliated fighters Andrei Arlovski, Paige VanZant, Austin Vanderford, Dalton Rosta, and Jorge Masvidal. They formed an alliance with Ethan Page and Scorpio Sky, otherwise known as the Men of the Year (both of which have legitimate extensive martial arts backgrounds, with Scorpio Sky having fought in MMA competition). On the 6 October edition of AEW Dynamite, it was announced that Dos Santos would be making his professional wrestling debut on the 15 October edition of AEW Rampage, teaming with Sky and Page to take on Jake Hager, Chris Jericho and Sammy Guevara (The Inner Circle) in a trios match.

Championships and accomplishments

Mixed Martial Arts
Ultimate Fighting Championship
UFC Heavyweight Championship (One time)
One successful title defense
Knockout of the Night (Three times) 
Fight of the Night (Three times) 
Longest winning streak in UFC Heavyweight division history (9)
 2nd most knockout wins in UFC Heavyweight history (10) - tied with Cain Velasquez 
FIGHT! Magazine
Upset of the Year (2008) 
MMAJunkie.com
2014 December Fight of the Month 
Sherdog
2010 All-Violence Third Team
2011 All-Violence First Team

Personal life
Dos Santos has stated that Antônio Rodrigo "Minotauro" Nogueira is his hero.

He is a Roman Catholic.

In January 2013, he announced that he had divorced his wife of ten years before competing at UFC 155.

On 9 March 2017, Dos Santos's first child, a boy, was born. Dos Santos's second child was born in May 2019 and was named Maria, after his mother.

Filmography 
Dos Santos featured as one of the contestants for Dança dos Famosos, the Brazilian version of Dancing with the Stars, which started on 25 August 2019 at Globo’s "Domingão do Faustão". Dos Santos was eliminated from the competition on 1 December 2019, placing fifth.

Mixed martial arts record

|-
|Loss
|align=center|21–10
|Yorgan De Castro
|TKO (shoulder injury)
|Eagle FC 47
|
|align=center|3
|align=center|0:35
|Miami, Florida, United States
|
|-
|Loss
|align=center|21–9
|Ciryl Gane
|TKO (elbow)
|UFC 256
|
|align=center|2
|align=center|2:34
|Las Vegas, Nevada, United States
|
|-
|Loss
|align=center|21–8
|Jairzinho Rozenstruik
|TKO (punches)
|UFC 252
|
|align=center|2
|align=center|3:47
|Las Vegas, Nevada, United States
|
|-
|Loss
|align=center|21–7
|Curtis Blaydes
|TKO (punches)
|UFC Fight Night: Blaydes vs. dos Santos
|
|align=center|2
|align=center|1:06
|Raleigh, North Carolina, United States
|
|-
|Loss
|align=center|21–6
|Francis Ngannou
|TKO (punches)
|UFC on ESPN: Ngannou vs. dos Santos
|
|align=center|1
|align=center|1:11
|Minneapolis, Minnesota, United States
|
|-
|Win
|align=center|21–5
|Derrick Lewis
|TKO (punches)
|UFC Fight Night: Lewis vs. dos Santos
|
|align=center|2
|align=center|1:58
|Wichita, Kansas, United States
|
|-
|Win
|align=center|20–5
|Tai Tuivasa
|TKO (punches)
|UFC Fight Night: dos Santos vs. Tuivasa
|
|align=center|2
|align=center|2:30
|Adelaide, Australia
|
|-
|Win
|align=center|19–5
|Blagoy Ivanov
|Decision (unanimous)
|UFC Fight Night: dos Santos vs. Ivanov
|
|align=center|5
|align=center|5:00
|Boise, Idaho, United States
|
|-
|Loss
|align=center|18–5
|Stipe Miocic
|TKO (punches)
|UFC 211
|
|align=center|1
|align=center|2:22
|Dallas, Texas, United States
|
|-
|Win
|align=center|18–4
|Ben Rothwell
|Decision (unanimous)
|UFC Fight Night: Rothwell vs. dos Santos
|
|align=center|5
|align=center|5:00
|Zagreb, Croatia
|
|-
|Loss
|align=center|17–4
|Alistair Overeem
|TKO (punches)
|UFC on Fox: dos Anjos vs. Cowboy 2
|
|align=center|2
|align=center|4:43
|Orlando, Florida, United States
|
|-
|Win
|align=center|17–3
|Stipe Miocic
|Decision (unanimous)
|UFC on Fox: dos Santos vs. Miocic
|
|align=center|5
|align=center|5:00
|Phoenix, Arizona, United States
|
|-
|Loss
|align=center|16–3
|Cain Velasquez
|TKO (slam and punch)
|UFC 166
|
|align=center|5
|align=center|3:09
|Houston, Texas, United States
|
|-
| Win
|align=center|16–2
|Mark Hunt
|KO (spinning hook kick)
|UFC 160
|
|align=center|3
|align=center|4:18
|Las Vegas, Nevada, United States
|
|-
|Loss
|align=center|15–2
|Cain Velasquez
|Decision (unanimous)
|UFC 155
|
|align=center|5
|align=center|5:00
|Las Vegas, Nevada, United States
|
|-
|Win
|align=center|15–1
|Frank Mir
|TKO (punches)
|UFC 146
|
|align=center|2
|align=center|3:04
|Las Vegas, Nevada, United States
|
|-
|Win
|align=center|14–1
|Cain Velasquez
|KO (punches)
|UFC on Fox: Velasquez vs. dos Santos
|
|align=center|1
|align=center|1:04
|Anaheim, California, United States
|
|-
|Win
|align=center|13–1
|Shane Carwin
|Decision (unanimous)
|UFC 131
|
|align=center|3
|align=center|5:00
|Vancouver, British Columbia, Canada
|
|-
|Win
|align=center|12–1
|Roy Nelson
|Decision (unanimous)
|UFC 117
|
|align=center|3
|align=center|5:00
|Oakland, California, United States
|
|-
|Win
|align=center|11–1
|Gabriel Gonzaga
|TKO (punches)
|UFC Live: Vera vs. Jones
|
|align=center|1
|align=center|3:53
|Broomfield, Colorado, United States
|
|-
|Win
|align=center|10–1
|Gilbert Yvel
|TKO (punches)
|UFC 108
|
|align=center|1
|align=center|2:07
|Las Vegas, Nevada, United States
|
|-
|Win
|align=center|9–1
|Mirko Cro Cop
|TKO (submission to punch)
|UFC 103
|
|align=center|3
|align=center|2:00
|Dallas, Texas, United States
|
|-
|Win
|align=center|8–1
|Stefan Struve
|TKO (punches)
|UFC 95
|
|align=center|1
|align=center|0:54
|London, England
|
|-
|Win
|align=center|7–1
|Fabrício Werdum
|TKO (punches)
|UFC 90
|
|align=center|1
|align=center|1:20
|Rosemont, Illinois, United States
|
|-
|Win
|align=center|6–1
|Geronimo dos Santos
|TKO (doctor stoppage)
|Demo Fight 3
|
|align=center|1
|align=center|0:44
|Salvador, Brazil
|
|-
|Loss
|align=center|5–1
|Joaquim Ferreira
|Submission (armbar)
|MTL: Final
|
|align=center|1
|align=center|1:13
|São Paulo, Brazil
|
|-
|Win
|align=center|5–0
|Jair Gonçalves
|TKO (punches)
|Mo Team League 2
|
|align=center|1
|align=center|2:52
|São Paulo, Brazil
|
|-
|Win
|align=center|4–0
|Joaquim Ferreira
|TKO (retirement)
|XFC: Brazil
|
|align=center|1
|align=center|5:00
|Rio de Janeiro, Brazil
|
|-
|Win
|align=center|3–0
|Edson Ramos
|TKO (doctor stoppage)
|XFC: Brazil
|
|align=center|1
|align=center|8:45
|Rio de Janeiro, Brazil
|
|-
|Win
|align=center|2–0
|Eduardo Maiorino
|Submission (guillotine choke)
|Minotauro Fights 5
|
|align=center|1
|align=center|0:50
|São Bernardo do Campo, Brazil
|
|-
|Win
|align=center|1–0
|Jailson Silva Santos
|KO (soccer kick)
|Demo Fight 1
|
|align=center|1
|align=center|2:58
|Salvador, Brazil
|

Pay-per-view bouts

See also
 List of male mixed martial artists

References

External links
 
 
 

Brazilian male mixed martial artists
Heavyweight mixed martial artists
Brazilian practitioners of Brazilian jiu-jitsu
Brazilian sportspeople in doping cases
Ultimate Fighting Championship champions
Brazilian people of Portuguese descent
Brazilian people of African descent
Living people
1984 births
Brazilian male boxers
Doping cases in mixed martial arts
People awarded a black belt in Brazilian jiu-jitsu
Sportspeople from Santa Catarina (state)
Brazilian Roman Catholics
Ultimate Fighting Championship male fighters
Mixed martial artists utilizing boxing
Mixed martial artists utilizing Brazilian jiu-jitsu
20th-century Brazilian people
21st-century Brazilian people